Arthur H. Rude (July 27, 1926 – March 9, 1986) was an American politician. He served as a Republican member for the 83rd and 85th district of the Florida House of Representatives.

Life and career 
Rude was born in Chicago, Illinois. He moved to Florida in 1956.

In 1966, Rude was elected to the Florida House of Representatives. The next year, he was elected as the first representative for the newly-established 83rd district. He served until 1970, when he was succeeded by George A. Williamson. In 1972, Rude was elected to represent the 85th district, succeeding William G. Zinkil. He served until 1976, when he was succeeded by Terence T. O'Malley.

Rude died in March 1986 at his daughter's home in Palm Beach County, Florida, at the age of 59.

References 

1926 births
1986 deaths
Politicians from Chicago
Republican Party members of the Florida House of Representatives
20th-century American politicians